Clonophoromyces is a genus of fungi in the family Laboulbeniaceae.

References

External links
Clonophoromyces at Index Fungorum

Laboulbeniaceae
Laboulbeniales genera